Cessford is a historic plantation house located at Eastville, Northampton County, Virginia. It was built about 1801, and is a -story, Federal style brick dwelling with a later two-story brick addition. It has a slate covered gable roof and features central pedimented porches on the north and south facades.  Also on the property are a contributing smokehouse, quarter kitchen, a utility building, and the original pattern of a garden. During the American Civil War, Brigadier General Henry Hayes Lockwood on July 23, 1862, commandeered the property for his headquarters and remained in residence of the property throughout the war.

The house was named after Cessford, in Scotland, the ancestral home of an early settler.

It was listed on the National Register of Historic Places in 2004. It is located in the Eastville Historical District.

References

External links
Cessford, U.S. Route 13, Eastville, Northampton County, VA 11 photos, 2 data pages, and 1 photo caption page at Historic American Buildings Survey

Historic American Buildings Survey in Virginia
Plantation houses in Virginia
Houses on the National Register of Historic Places in Virginia
Federal architecture in Virginia
Houses completed in 1801
Houses in Northampton County, Virginia
National Register of Historic Places in Northampton County, Virginia
Individually listed contributing properties to historic districts on the National Register in Virginia
1801 establishments in Virginia